Venerable Long Gen (Chinese: 隆根长老) (1921-2011) was a key monastic figure in the Singapore Buddhist community.

Early life
Venerable Long Gen was born in the Jiangsu province of China in 1921. He became a Buddhist monk at the age of 10, and received ordination at Mount Bao Hua in Nanjing at the age of 22. In 1949, he left Wuchang to Guangzhou and Hong Kong, and in 1956 visited Taiwan.

Achievements In South East Asia
When Ven Long Gen was in Penang in 1960 propagating Buddhism, he also began the publication of Buddhist collateral in Malaysia and Singapore. Thereafter in 1964, Venerable Long Gen stayed settled down in Singapore, gradually relocating the Nanyang Buddhist Bookstore from Penang to Singapore. In November 1973, Venerable Long Gen was appointed as the Abbot of Leng Foong Prajna Temple. He also participated in the Singapore Buddhist Federation since 1984 before taking on the leadership of Buddhist Federation in July 1994. He died in 2011, aged 91.

See also
Venerable Zhuan Dao
Venerable Hong Choon
Buddhism in Singapore

References

Singaporean religious leaders
Singaporean Buddhist monks
1921 births
2011 deaths